Kim Sung-joon (born 10 July 1968) is a South Korean sport shooter who competed in the 1996 Summer Olympics.

References

1968 births
Living people
South Korean male sport shooters
ISSF pistol shooters
Olympic shooters of South Korea
Shooters at the 1996 Summer Olympics
Shooters at the 1994 Asian Games
Shooters at the 1998 Asian Games
Asian Games medalists in shooting
Asian Games bronze medalists for South Korea
Medalists at the 1998 Asian Games
20th-century South Korean people
21st-century South Korean people